West, Abbot's and Lound Woods is a  biological Site of Special Scientific Interest south of Wittering in Cambridgeshire.

The site has a variety of woodland types, some of which are rare in Britain, including plateau alderwood. There are ancient woodland plants such as yellow archangel and toothwort.

The site is private land with no public access.

References

Sites of Special Scientific Interest in Cambridgeshire